Koregaon is a census town and headquarters for the surrounding Koregaon Taluka in the Satara subdivision of Satara district in the Indian state of Maharashtra. It is situated on the NH-548C Satara-Baitul National Highway about 18 km east of Satara city, about 120 km from Pune and 267 km from Mumbai.  The Koregaon railway station, situated on the Pune - Miraj line, is 2 kilometers outside the town. At a stone's throw from the railway station is Koregaon Bus Station.

Dr. B.R.Ambedkar writes about his childhood experience of travelling from Satara to Koregaon, and the discrimination they suffered, in his autobiographical book, Waiting for a Visa (chapter 1).

Demographics
In the 2011 India census, the town of Koregaon had a population of 26 987 individuals.

Kedareshwar Mandir 

In Koregaon there is a temple to Shiva, named Kedareshwar Mandir in Marathi.  This place is large, and well known in all neighboring areas of Koregaon.

Education
Saraswati English Medium School and Jr. College, Koregaon.
The Modern English School and Jr. College, Koregaon.
Saraswati Vidyalaya, K.V. Bhandari Primary School Koregaon.
Challenge Academy, Koregaon.
Kanya. Madhyamik Vidhylaya, Koregaon.
D.P. Bhosale College Koregaon.
Industrial Training Institute (ITI) Koregaon.
Shri Mudhaidevi Shikshan Sanstha's Shri Mudhaidevi Vidyamandir, Deur.
Marutrao Krushnaji Mane Junior College, Deur.
Prof.vSambhajirao Kadam College, Deur.
Shri. Wangdev Vidyalaya &, Jr. College, Wathar Station. 
Yashwantrao Chavan Vidyalaya, Pimpode Bk.
Bharat Vidya Mandir & Jr College Wagholi.
Kala Mahavidyalaya Wagholi, Vidyanagar (Graduation in Arts, Commerce)

Business and industry 
The main attraction is the Koregaon (Mini) Industrial Area developed on the Koregaon-Rahimatpur Road. One of the main industries is the production of beans (called 'Wagha Ghevada' in Marathi and 'Rajma' in Hindi language).

Rivers 
There are two rivers in Koregaon; one flows within the town and other is outside. The first river's name is Tilaganga and other one's name is Vasana.

Politics

See also
Kinhai

References

External links
Satara District Gazette:
http://www.maharashtra.gov.in/english/gazetteer/SATARA/agri_holdings.html
http://www.maharashtra.gov.in/english/gazetteer/SATARA/places_Koregaon.html

Cities and towns in Satara district
Talukas in Maharashtra